Moco may refer to:

Biochemistry
 Molybdenum cofactor, any of a number of biochemical cofactors
 MOCOS, molybdenum cofactor sulfurase
 Moco RNA motif, a conserved RNA structure presumed to be a riboswitch that binds molybdenum cofactor
 Moco-II RNA motif, a conserved RNA structure identified by bioinformatics

Business
 Moelis & Company, a global independent investment bank (referred to colloquially as MoCo)
 Mozilla Corporation
 Nissan Moco, marketed name for the Suzuki MR Wagon in Japan

Geography
Montgomery County, Maryland, nicknamed "MoCo"
Mount Moco, the tallest mountain in Angola

People 
 Chilala Moco (born 1977), an Angolan photographer
 Marcolino Moco (born 1953), the Prime Minister of Angola 1992–1996
 Didi Mocó, stage name of Brazilian comedian Renato Aragão (born 1935)
 Miss Moço, Canadian drag queen
 "Moco", stage name of Julian Villarreal from the Mexican band and record producer (Celso Piña) (Banda Machos) (Tigrillos) El Gran Silencio
 Moco, the fictional drug lord in the 1992 film El Mariachi portrayed by Peter Marquardt
 Moco, a character in the anime Dragon Quest

Zoology
 Mocó (Kerodon rupestris), also known as the rock cavy, a Brazilian rodent
 Oligosoma moco, or Moko skink, a species of skink endemic to New Zealand

See also 
 Loco moco, a traditional meal in Hawaiian cuisine